The Masters Tournament Par-3 contest is a golf competition that precedes the Masters Tournament at Augusta National Golf Club in Augusta, Georgia. The first Par-3 contest was held before the 1960 tournament, and was won by three-time Masters champion Sam Snead.  The contest takes place in a single round on a nine-hole, par-27 course in the northeast corner of the club's grounds, designed in 1958 by George Cobb and club founder Clifford Roberts.

Traditionally, the contest participants have invited family members to caddie for them, sometimes allowing them to play shots on their behalf. Through the 2019 contest, ninety-four holes in one have been recorded, including nine in the 2016 event.

Snead became the contest's first multiple winner in 1974, fourteen years after his first. The most recent is Tom Watson, who won his second Par-3 contest in 2018, 36 years after his first in 1982. Pádraig Harrington is the only one with three wins; he won his first pair in consecutive years (2003, 2004), as did Sandy Lyle (1997, 1998). Seven players have multiple wins; the other three are Isao Aoki, Jay Haas, and David Toms.  

Jimmy Walker holds the course record of 19 (–8), set in 2016, which included an ace. The contest has been decided by a playoff on 21 occasions, and concluded with a tie twice.  Just 14 of the 59 winners (including ties) are non-American.  No winner of the Par-3 contest has gone on to win the Masters in the

Winners

Key
* - playoff 
 - tie 

(a) - amateur

Masters champions who also won a Par-3 contest

No player has won the Par-3 contest and the Masters in the same year, a fact well known by the players.Raymond Floyd came the closest in the 1990 tournament, but lost in a sudden-death playoff.
Ben Crenshaw and Vijay Singh are the only players to win a Masters after winning a Par-3 contest.
Tom Watson is the only player to hold both titles at once, for four days, winning the Par-3 contest in 1982 as defending Masters champion.

Notes
 Par is a predetermined number of strokes that a golfer should require to complete a hole, a round (the sum of the total pars of the played holes), or a tournament (the sum of the total pars of each round). E stands for even, which means the round was completed in the predetermined number of strokes.

References

External links
About Golf – The Masters Par-3 Contest winners

Par-3 contest
1960 establishments in the United States